Tammelinn (Estonian for "Oak Town") is a neighbourhood of Tartu, Estonia.

Gallery

See also
Tamme Stadium
Tartu TV Mast

References

Tartu